The 1951–52 Boston Bruins season was the Bruins' 28th season in the NHL.

Offseason
Despite a successful two seasons in goal, including winning the Calder Memorial Trophy as rookie of the year in the 1950 season, Bruins goaltender Jack Gelineau asked general manager Art Ross for a raise.  Upon being rejected, he left the team for a business position in Montreal.  The Bruins acquired former Rangers and Black Hawks goaltender Jim Henry to replace him.  In another offseason deal, the Bruins traded Paul Ronty to the Rangers for former Bruin farmland and 1949 Calder Trophy winner Pentti Lund and Gus Kyle.

Regular season

On October 12 -- the day after the season started -- team owner Weston Adams sold a controlling interest in the Bruins to the Boston Garden-Arena Corporation, led by Walter A. Brown, the general manager of Boston Garden and owner of the Boston Celtics.

Due to a collapse of the brine pipes at Boston Garden, the February 26th game against the Detroit Red Wings had to be transferred to Boston Arena, the Bruins' original home.  The 4-3 loss would prove to be the final regular season game the Bruins played at the Arena.

On March 18 against the Chicago Black Hawks, team captain Milt Schmidt not only scored his 200th goal, but was honored in a game that saw former Kraut Line teammate Bobby Bauer come out of a five year retirement to join Schmidt and Woody Dumart in the match.  Bauer scored a goal and assist in the Bruins' 4-0 win, his final NHL game.

Final standings

Record vs. opponents

Schedule and results

Playoffs

Player statistics

Regular season
Scoring

Goaltending

Playoffs
Scoring

Goaltending

Awards and records

Transactions

See also
1951–52 NHL season

References

External links

Boston Bruins season, 1951-52
Boston Bruins season, 1951-52
Boston Bruins seasons
Boston
Boston
1950s in Boston